Srđan Ćuk (born November 17, 1977) known better by his stage name, General Woo, is a Croatian rapper.

He began his career in 1994. He is currently signed to Aquarius Records. In 1999 he was part of one of the first successful rap acts in Croatia Tram 11.

General Woo was born in and lives in Vukovar, where he also started organizing an open-air hip-hop festival in 2007.
He hosts a Hip-Hop radio station called Blackout Radio Vukovar in his home town of Vukovar. In 2011 he released his fourth studio album Verbalni Delikt on MTV's web site on free download. In 2014 his fifth studio album called Pad Sistem (Fall of the System) came out.

Albums
Solo albums
2002 - Takozvani(So called)
2005 - Baš je lijep ovaj svijet (with Nered)(What a Beautiful World)
2006 - Krv nije voda(Blood is Not Water)
2011 - Verbalni delikt
2014 - Pad sistema(Fall of The System)

Demo's
1994: - General Woo (Demo)
1996: - Verbalator (Demo)
1998: - WorkshopCLASS Volume#11

As part of Tram 11
1999 - Čovječe ne ljuti se
2000 - Vrućina gradskog asfalta
2003 - Tajna crne kutije
2022 - Jedan i jedan

As part of Blackout Project
1996 - Project Impossible
2000 - Blackout 00

References

1977 births
Living people
People from Vukovar
Croatian rappers